Lord Burns may refer to either:

David Burns, Lord Burns, Scottish judge
Terence Burns, Baron Burns, life peer